EP Phone Home may refer to:

EP Phone Home (Ben Kweller EP), 2001
EP Phone Home (Home Grown EP), 1999